Barry Murphy (born 1 April 1959 in Dublin) was an Irish soccer player during the 1980s. He earned 1 cap under Jack Charlton for the Irish national team.

He represented St Patrick's Athletic, Bohemians, Shamrock Rovers F.C., Kilkenny City and Athlone Town during his career in the League of Ireland. He signed for the Gypsies in 1981/82 from St. Pats and made his debut against Sligo Rovers in September 1981. He captained Bohs in 1986/87 and made 148 league appearances (7 goals) and 6 European appearances  for the club before signing for Rovers at the beginning of the 1988/89 season. Murphy scored 2 goals in 91 appearances for the Hoops.

Honours
Leinster Senior Cup (football)
 Bohemian F.C. - 1985

References

Republic of Ireland association footballers
Association football defenders
League of Ireland players
League of Ireland XI players
Bohemian F.C. players
Shamrock Rovers F.C. players
Athlone Town A.F.C. players
Kilkenny City A.F.C. players
St Patrick's Athletic F.C. players
Republic of Ireland international footballers
1959 births
Living people
Association footballers from County Dublin